David Stenhouse (born 23 May 1932, in Sutton, Surrey, England. He proposed the "4-factor" theory of evolutionary intelligence and was active in ethology, education, evolutionary biology and philosophy of science in Australia and New Zealand.

He died after a short illness on 27 August 2013 in Palmerston North, New Zealand.

Early life and family
Stenhouse spent his childhood on the outskirts of London and in South-West Scotland, where his parents were from. His paternal grandfather, also called David, was the headmaster of the Sandbank school. The son of J.F.M. & M.M. Stenhouse, he has one sister, Joyce. His parents moved to New Zealand when he was in his teens.
He has 7 children from 2 marriages. His eldest son, Dr. John Stenhouse, was a lecturer in History at Massey University, and is currently Associate Professor in History at the University of Otago.

Work
After taking degrees in both Philosophy (under John Passmore) and Zoology at the University of Otago, he lectured at universities in New Zealand and Australia – in the Department of Zoology at The University of Queensland, the Department of Education at Massey University, and the Department of Psychology at Massey University. He is the author of a number of books and articles.

Selected publications

Books
 Crisis in Abundance, published in 1966 (Heinemann).
 Unstated assumptions in education : a cross-cultural investigation, published in 1972.
 The Evolution of Intelligence : A general theory and some of its implications, published in 1974 (Allen and Unwin,  and ) (Japanese edition: "Chino no shinka : chiteki kodo no ippan riron"; Italian edition).
 Active Philosophy in Education and Science: Paradigms and Language-Games, published in 1985 (Cambridge, MA: Allen and Unwin.  and ).

Articles

 

 
 
 
 
 
D Stenhouse, MJR Gaffikin (1976), "Behavioural accounting and the changing nature of the human behavioural/social sciences : some implications of the ethological revolution", Occasional Paper, Massey University, New Zealand.
 
Stenhouse, David (1979), "The Wittgensteinian Revolution and Linguistic Philosophy: Some Implications for Education and Educational Philosophy", PhD Thesis, Massey University, New Zealand.

References

1932 births
2013 deaths
Evolutionary biologists
Philosophers of science
Ethologists
New Zealand non-fiction writers
University of Otago alumni
Massey University alumni
Academic staff of the University of Queensland
Academic staff of the Massey University
People from the London Borough of Sutton
Academic staff of the University of Otago
Plant cognition